KF Nörd is an Icelandic television program on Sýn of the FC Nerds format. It is a television show about 16 Icelandic nerds—selected out of the nerds of Iceland, and trained to their physical peaks—who compete with the winners of Landsbankadeildin (Icelandic Premier League in Football, won most recently by Fimleikafélag Hafnarfjarðar). It first aired on 31 August 2006.

2006 Squad
1. Ragnar Elías Ólafsson
2. Björn Elíeser Jónsson
3. Davíð Fannar Gunnarsson
4. Ingþór Guðmundsson
5. Hilmar Kristjánsson
6. Einar Örn Ólafsson
7. Guðni G. Kristjánsson
8. Ágúst Hlynur Hólmgeirsson
9. Þórarinn Gunnarsson
10. Vilhjálmur Andri Kjartansson
11. G. S. Ólafsson
12. Ívan Þór Ólafsson
13. Tandri Waage
14. Kári Gunnarsson
15. Hermann Fannar Gíslason
16. Kristján Helgi Benjamínsson

External links
Official website
Sýn website

2006 Icelandic television series debuts
2000s Icelandic television series
2010s Icelandic television series
2000s reality television series
Stöð 2 original programming